James Weinstein is an American legal scholar who holds the Dan Cracchiolo Chair in Constitutional Law at the Sandra Day O'Connor College of Law at Arizona State University. He is a defender of the American form of free speech and opposes laws banning hate speech.

References

Living people
Arizona State University faculty
American legal scholars
Year of birth missing (living people)